The Directorate-General for Communication (DG COMM) is a Directorate-General of the European Commission.

The mission of the DG Communication is:
 To inform the media and citizens of the activities of the European Commission and to communicate the objectives and goals of its policies and actions. 
 To inform the Commission of the evolution of opinion in the Member States.

The DG Communication is based in Brussels.

External links
 

Communication
General Services in the European Commission